Mulberry Island is located along the James River in the city of Newport News, Virginia, in southeastern Virginia at the confluence of the Warwick River on the Virginia Peninsula.

History

Mulberry Island, settled shortly after Jamestown, was established a few miles downriver in 1607. It was at Mulberry Island where the colonists who were preparing to leave Virginia during the Starving Time in 1610 were met by Thomas West, 3rd Baron De La Warr with fresh provisions from England. By 1614, thousands of acres were under cultivation with tobacco, the export crop introduced by John Rolfe which saved the Virginia Colony financially. In 1619, Mulberry Island was part of the plantation held by William Pierce, father-in-law of Rolfe.

During the American Civil War, Mulberry Island was the southern end of the Warwick Line, a series of defensive works built across the Virginia Peninsula to Yorktown manned by troops of Confederate General John B. Magruder during the Peninsula Campaign of 1862.

From 1898 to 1918, Mulberry Island was home to Davis & Kimpton Brickyard.  The brickyard sat on the west bank of the Warwick River.

Prior to its acquisition by the U.S. government for $538,000, Mulberry Island was primarily farmland. During the first World War, Camp Abraham Eustis was established on the historic island and adjacent land in Warwick County, upstream from Newport News Shipbuilding and Drydock Company. Named for Abraham Eustis, a famous U.S. Army General from Petersburg, the camp had balloon observation school, and an artillery school that remained in operation through the end of World War II.  Camp Eustis became Fort Eustis and a permanent Army base in 1923.  In 2010, it was combined with nearby Langley Air Force Base to form Joint Base Langley–Eustis.

Modern times

Fort Eustis is currently home to the United States Army Training and Doctrine Command (TRADOC). Since 1958, following a political consolidation of the former Warwick County with the independent city of Newport News, almost all of the base and all of Mulberry Island are located within the corporate limits of Newport News. An Army Aviation School is also located at Fort Eustis.

An array of ships part of the National Defense Reserve Fleet are anchored adjacent to Mulberry Island in the middle of the James River. Considered an environmental hazard, the numbers of this reserve fleet are being reduced each year as ships are transported away as scrap. These ships are termed the "Idle Fleet" in local parlance.

References

Notes

Sources
 Eustace Families Association website
 Fort Eustis history

External links
Fort Eustis official website
Davis & Kimpton Brickyard - DoI National Historic Places Registration

James River (Virginia)
Landforms of Newport News, Virginia
River islands of Virginia